Gina is a Canadian drama film from Quebec, directed by Denys Arcand and released in 1975. The film stars Celine Lomez as Gina, a stripper who, after being raped in a motel room, hires two criminal thugs to exact her revenge on the rapists.

Synopsis 
Three parallel story lines draw an exploited hotel stripper (Lomez) who is sent to work a small Quebec town, a drunken gang of hell-raising snowmobilers, and a film crew attempting to shoot a political documentary about exploited textile workers (echoing Denys Arcand's own NFB-banned documentary On est au coton), together into a potent mixture of action, violence against women, and film as a political tool.

References

External links
 

1975 films
1975 crime drama films
Canadian crime drama films
1970s French-language films
Films directed by Denys Arcand
Gang rape in fiction
French-language Canadian films
1970s Canadian films